From 1138 to 1228, part of the Duchy of Kraków and Sandomierz, belonging to the high-dukes of Poland.

Dukes of Sieradz-Łęczyca
 1228–1232 Henry I the Bearded (Henryk I Brodaty)
 1232–1233 Konrad of Masovia (Konrad Mazowiecki)
 1234–1247 Konrad of Masovia (Konrad Mazowiecki)
 1247–1260 Casimir I of Kuyavia (Kazimierz I Mazowiecki)
 1260–1275 Leszek the Black (Leszek Czarny)
 1275–1294 divided into two duchies of Sieradz and Lęczyca (see below)
 1294–1297 Władysław I the Elbow-high (Władysław Łokietek)
 1297–1305 Wenceslaus II of Bohemia (Wacław II Czeski)
After 1305 parts of the united Kingdom of Poland initially as two vassal duchies, later incorporated as Łęczyca Voivodeship and Sieradz Voivodeship.

Dukes of Sieradz

 1233–1234 Boleslaus I of Mazovia (Bolesław I Mazowiecki)
 1275–1288 Leszek the Black (Leszek Czarny)
 1288–1294 Władysław I the Elbow-high (Władysław Łokietek )
 1327–1339 Przemysl of Cuiavia (Przemysł Kujawski)

After 1305 part of the united Kingdom of Poland as a vassal duchy, later after 1339 incorporated by the king Casimir III the Great as the Sieradz Voivodeship.

Dukes of Łęczyca
 1233–1234 Konrad of Masovia (Konrad Mazowiecki)
 1275–1294 Casimir II of Łęczyca (Kazimierz II)
 1329–1343 Ladislaus of Dobrzyn (Władysław Dobrzyński)

After 1305 part of the united Kingdom of Poland as a vassal duchy, later after 1343 incorporated by the king Casimir III the Great as the Łęczyca Voivodeship.